Roberto Carlos "Pato" Abbondanzieri (born Abbondancieri on 19 August 1972) is an Argentine professional former footballer who played as a goalkeeper.

He spent most of his career at  Boca Juniors in his homeland, as well as Getafe of La Liga and Internacional of Brazil. He is currently the assistant manager of Pachuca.

Abbondanzieri earned 49 caps for the Argentina national football team from 2004 to 2008, playing at two Copa America tournaments and the 2006 FIFA World Cup.

Club career

Early career
Born in Bouquet, Santa Fe, Abbondanzieri's professional debut took place on 6 December 1994 at Santa Fe's Rosario Central, with whom he would soon after winning the 1995 CONMEBOL Cup. He played with the club until 1997, when he moved to Boca Juniors to be the reserve goalkeeper.

Abbondanzieri trained in the shadow of Óscar Córdoba until the Colombian goalie suffered an injury during the Clausura tournament of 1999. However, Abbondanzieri himself then suffered a shoulder injury during a match against River Plate, and the club's third-choice goalkeeper, Cristian Muñoz, took his place. When he recovered from his injury Abbondanzieri was once again Córdoba's understudy until February 2002, when Córdoba moved to Italian club Perugia.

Abbondanzieri changed his name in July 2002 from Abbondancieri, a misspelling that arose at Argentinian customs when his grandfather immigrated there, to the original spelling that he uses today. The name change was prompted by Italian citizenship concerns in the case of his transfer to the European football leagues. He was named South American Goalkeeper of the Year in 2003.

Until September 2006, when Boca achieved their third Recopa Sudamericana, he held the Boca Juniors record of 14 titles, surpassed later by Guillermo Barros Schelotto.

Getafe
In June 2006, after weeks of speculation, Abbondanzieri signed a three-year contract with Spanish first division Getafe CF, claiming that "it's the right time for me to go to Europe".  In his debut season in the Spanish league, he won the Ricardo Zamora Trophy to the best goalkeeper, after conceding only 30 goals in 37 matches.

On 10 April 2008, in a UEFA Cup quarterfinal second-leg match against Bayern Munich, Abbondanzieri made a vital error in extra time, as the goalkeeper failed to hold a routine ball from a distant free-kick. The ball slipped under his legs while in the six-yard box, allowing Bayern striker Luca Toni to tap the ball into the back of the net. Bayern was still in deficit of goals on aggregate, as the score was 2–3 after the goal (3–4 on aggregate), but only five minutes later Bayern would level the score at 3–3 (4–4 on aggregate) and allow themselves passage to the UEFA Cup semifinals via the away goals rule.

Return to South America
Abbondanzieri continued with Getafe for the first half of the 2008–2009 season, but at his request was transferred back to Boca Juniors for the 2009 Clausura tournament. "El Pato" was again Boca's number one and competed in the Clausura, although Boca only finished in 14th. He also participated in the Copa Libertadores, where Boca fell to Defensor Sporting of Uruguay in the round of 16.

On 16 February 2010, Internacional signed the Argentine goalkeeper "Pato" from Boca Juniors.
Abbondanzieri retired on 18 December after the match against Seongnam for the third place of FIFA Club World Cup. Internacional won 4–2.

Coaching
In November 2012, Abbondanzieri was named as assistant when his former Boca teammate Martín Palermo was hired at Godoy Cruz Antonio Tomba. In April 2014, the pair and Rolando Schiavi took the same job at Arsenal de Sarandí.

Abbondanzieri and Palermo moved to Chile to manage Unión Española in May 2016.

On 28 November 2020, Abbondanzieri was appointed assistant coach at Chilean club Curicó Unido, once again under Martín Palermo. However, at the end of May 2021, Abbondanzieri announced that he would step back from football to spent more time with his family.

International career 
As a youth, Abbondanzieri represented Argentina in the 1989 FIFA U-17 World Championship.

Since then, he became a continuous presence in Boca's goal and, in June 2004, he became the goalkeeper for the Argentina national team and has since played in the Copa América 2004 and the South American Qualification for the 2006 FIFA World Cup.

On 6 May 2006, he was named as a definite squad member for the 2006 World Cup by coach José Pekerman.

On 30 June 2006, he was injured in the World Cup quarter-finals against hosts Germany, after Argentina had taken a 1–0 lead. German striker Miroslav Klose jumped up high for a header while running and collided with Abbondanzieri, with Klose's right leg hitting the Argentinian keeper in the chest. Klose, who had looked sideways to watch for the ball in the moments leading up to the collision and thus may not have seen Abbondanzieri, received no penalty. Abbondanzieri continued at first but had to be carried off on a stretcher some minutes later, to be replaced by Leo Franco, who later failed to save Klose's equalizing strike in the 80th minute, and the four penalty kicks in the ensuing penalty shootout, which Argentina lost 2–4.

He continued to be Argentina's first choice goalkeeper under Alfio Basile following the 2006 World Cup. He played all six games in the 2007 Copa America in Venezuela as Argentina reached the final, only to lose to Brazil, 3–0. He remained Basile's goalkeeper through the early stages of qualifying for the 2010 World Cup in South Africa but was forced out injured during a 1–1 draw at home to Paraguay. After recovering from his injury, Basile had been replaced by Diego Maradona, who left him off the squad.

Career statistics

Club

International 
Appearances and goals by national team and year

Honours 
Rosario Central
Copa Conmebol 1995
Boca Juniors
Apertura 1998, 2000, 2003 and 2005
Clausura 1999, 2006
Copa Libertadores 2000, 2001, 2003
Intercontinental Cup 2000 and 2003
Copa Sudamericana 2004 and 2005
Recopa Sudamericana 2005
Internacional
Copa Libertadores 2010
Individual
South America Best goalkeeper in South America 2003
Copa Sudamericana Best goalkeeper 2005
Copa Sudamericana Best Player of the Final 2005
Ricardo Zamora Trophy, best goalkeeper of La Liga: 2006–07
Top 10 Goalkeeper of the 21st Century (IFFHS): 2001–2011

References

External links

fifaworldcup profile 
Argentina Primera Statistics at Fútbol XXI  
Guardian statistics
IMDB profile

1972 births
Living people
Argentina international footballers
La Liga players
Getafe CF footballers
Rosario Central footballers
Boca Juniors footballers
Sport Club Internacional players
Association football goalkeepers
2004 Copa América players
2006 FIFA World Cup players
People from Belgrano Department, Santa Fe
Argentine sportspeople of Italian descent
Argentine expatriate footballers
Argentine footballers
Copa Libertadores-winning players
Expatriate footballers in Brazil
Expatriate footballers in Spain
Expatriate football managers in Chile
Argentine expatriate sportspeople in Brazil
Argentine expatriate sportspeople in Spain
Argentine Primera División players
Argentina youth international footballers
Argentine expatriate sportspeople in Chile
Argentine football managers
Sportspeople from Santa Fe Province